Sir Elliot Graham Colvin K.C.S.I. (1861-1940) was a civil servant in the British Indian government.

Early life
Elliot Colvin was born on 18 July 1861. 

He was educated at Charter House and King’s College, Cambridge.

Career
Colvin joined the Indian Civil Service in the early 1880s. He was listed in the India Office List (1911) as agent to the Governor General, Rajputana in 1882.

Family
He married Ethel Augusta on 7 December 1889 at St. Paul's Cathedral, Calcutta (now Kolkata).

Honours
C.S.I. 1906.

References

External links 
https://en.wikisource.org/wiki/The_Indian_Biographical_Dictionary_(1915)/Colvin,_Sir_Elliot_Graham

19th-century British civil servants
20th-century British civil servants
Indian Civil Service (British India) officers
1861 births
1940 deaths